Ongarue is a rural community in the Ruapehu District and Manawatū-Whanganui region of New Zealand's North Island. It is located south of Te Kuiti and Waimiha, and north of Taumarunui. It is in meshblock 1041902, which had a population of 54 in 2013.

The New Zealand Ministry for Culture and Heritage gives a translation of "place of shaking" (i.e. an earthquake) for Ōngarue.

The village formerly had a timber mill and railway station and is at the lower end of the Timber Trail cycle route.

The area has two local marae:
 Te Kōura Marae and Te Karohirohi meeting house is affiliated with the Ngāti Maniapoto hapū of Pahere, and with Te Āwhitu.
 Te Rongaroa Marae and Ko Uehaeroa meeting house are affiliated with the Ngāti Maniapoto hapū of Raerae and Rōrā.

Education

References

Populated places in Manawatū-Whanganui
Ruapehu District